The U.S. state of Arizona's State Routes are usually abbreviated as SR.

History
The Arizona State Highway system was introduced on September 9, 1927, by the State Highway Commission (formed on August 11 of the same year). It incorporated the new federal aid system and also the U.S. Highway system. The 1927 plan included 27 state routes, most of which were simply dirt roads. Until 1942, the state route marker signs contained a Native American swastika that were used by Navajos, but were removed after the U.S.'s entry into World War II against Nazi Germany which had a reversed swastika as its emblem and became strongly negatively associated with the Nazis.

The modern system was introduced and adopted in the 1950s.

Designations and nomenclatures
The Arizona Department of Transportation (ADOT) internally recognizes Interstate Highways, U.S. Highways and Arizona Highways as all being separate types of highway designations. State highways within Arizona are referred to as Arizona State Routes or State Routes, with the prefix "SR" being used for abbreviations. ADOT also recognizes seven different types of suffixed routes for the U.S. Highways and State Routes. The recognized suffixes consist of the following with "(Number)" filling in for a numeric designation:
Alternate (A) – Referred to as "State Route (Number)A" and abbreviated as "SR (Number)A".
Business Route (B) – Referred to as "State Business Route (Number)" and abbreviated as "SR (Number)B" or "SR (Number) Bus.".
Loop Route (L) – Referred to as "State Loop Route (Number)" and abbreviated as "SR (Number)L". Despite often having "Loop" within their titles, SR 101, SR 202 and SR 303 are not considered "Loop Routes" by ADOT, nor are Interstate Business Loops. To date, SR 89L has been the only Loop Route recognized by ADOT.
Spur (S) – Referred to as "State Route (Number) Spur" and abbreviated as "SR (Number)S" or "SR (Number) Spur".
Truck (T) - Referred to as "State Route (Number) Truck" and abbreviated as "SR (Number) Truck".
Temporary (X) - Publicly referred to as "State Route (Number) Temporary" or "State Route (Number)T" and abbreviated "SR (Number)T". Internally referred to as "State Route (Number)X" and abbreviated "SR (Number)X".
Wye Leg (Y) - Referred to as "State Route (Number)Y" and abbreviated "SR (Number)Y".

U.S. Highways can also use the same suffixes listed above. Usually the suffixed routes are recognized by ADOT as U.S. Highways. For example, the Alternate route of U.S. Route 89 (US 89) is referred to as U.S. Route 89A (US 89A) instead of State Route 89A (SR 89A). The only exception to this rule is SR 93X, which is a suffixed route of US 93. Suffixed routes for Interstates are a different story. Although the suffixed routes are signed with Interstate green Business shields, they are recognized by ADOT as suffixed State Routes. In the field, Interstate 10 business routes are signed as Interstate 10 Business Loop or Interstate 10 Business Spur, while they are referred to by ADOT as "State Business Route 10" (SR 10B) and "State Route 10 Spur" (SR 10 Spur). The same principle applies with business routes for all other Interstates in Arizona.

Designations listed under Highway Logs and GIS data however, use the Arizona Transportation Information System (ATIS) nomenclature. The ATIS designation for a non-suffixed state route is "S (Number)". The number at the end is always three digits long. As such, all two digit routes are referred to under the ATIS terminology as "S 0(Number)". SR 260 and SR 79 are known under ATIS nomenclature as "S 260" and "S 079" respectively. U.S. Highways replace the prefix "S" used by State Routes under the ATIS nomenclature with "U" while Interstate Highways use the prefix "I". Suffixed routes under ATIS always have the internally applied suffix between the prefix. State Business Route 79 under ATIS nomenclature is referred to as "SB079" and SR 93X is "SX093".

State Routes

Unbuilt routes

Some routes listed here were eventually constructed using other route numbers.

Arizona Parkways, Historic and Scenic Roads

Currently, the Arizona Department of Transportation recognizes 26 state designated routes under the Parkways, Historic and Scenic Roads Program. Four are Historic Roads, 17 are Scenic Roads and five are Parkways.

Parkways
  Kaibab Plateau-North Rim Parkway - From US 89A to the Grand Canyon National Park boundary.
  Organ Pipe Cactus Parkway - From Why to Mexico.
  Sky Island Parkway - From Catalina Highway at the Coronado National Forest boundary to General Hitchcock Highway in Summerhaven
  Swift Trail Parkway - From SR 366 near US 191 to the western terminus of SR 366.

Historic Roads
  Apache Trail Historic Road - From SR 88 in Goldfield to SR 188 in Roosevelt
  Historic Route 66 - From I-40 in Topock to I-40 in Holbrook (In discontinuous sections connected together by I-40)
  Historic U.S. Route 80 - From Yuma to NM 80 in New Mexico (Discontinuous sections connected together by I-8 and I-10)
  Jerome-Clarkdale-Cottonwood Historic Road (Historic US 89A) - From SR 89A in Jerome to SR 89A at the Coconino National Forest boundary.

Scenic Roads
 Copper Corridor Scenic Road - SR 177 Section: From US 60 in Superior to SR 177 in Kearny. SR 77 Section: From SR 77 inside Tonto National Forest to SR 77 south of Dudleyville.
 Coronado Trail Scenic Road - From US 191 near Springerville to US 191 near Morenci.
 Desert Tall Pines Scenic Road - Entire length of SR 288.
 Diné Tah Among The People Scenic Road - From N-64 in Chinle to N-12 at I-40 near Lupton. (In two discontinuous sections, connected by N-12 through New Mexico)
 Fredonia-Vermilion Cliffs Scenic Road - From US 89A in Colorado City to US 89 in Bitter Springs.
 Gila-Pinal Scenic Road - From US 60 in Florence to US 60 at the Tonto National Forest boundary near Miami.
 Joshua Forest Scenic Road - From US 93 in Wikieup to US 93 in Wickenburg.
 Kayenta-Monument Valley Scenic Road - From US 160 in Kayenta to US 163 in Utah.
 Mingus Mountain Scenic Road - From SR 89A in Jerome to SR 89A at the Coconino National Forest boundary.
 Naat'tsis'aan Navajo Mountain Scenic Road - From SR 98 in Lechee to US 160.
 Patagonia-Sonoita Scenic Road - From SR 83 at I-10 in Vail to SR 82 near Nogales.
 Red Rock All American Road - From SR 179 in Sedona to SR 179 near I-17.
 San Francisco Peaks Scenic Road - From US 180 in Flagstaff to US 180 near Valle.
 Sedona-Oak Creek Canyon Scenic Road - From SR 89A in Sedona to SR 89A milepost 390 inside Coconino National Forest.
 Tse'nikani Flat Mesa Rock Scenic Road - From US 160 near Mexican Water to US 191 near Many Farms.
 White Mountain Scenic Road - From SR 260 in McNary to the SR 260 junction with SR 261, full length of SR 273 and Full length of SR 261.
 White River Scenic Road - From SR 260 near McNary to SR 73 in White River.

See also

References
 Arizona DOT Highway Log
 Arizona DOT Right-of-Way Resolutions (Works Consulting LLC)

External links
Arizona State Roads Page
AARoads Arizona Highways Page

State routes